The 2013–14 Tennessee Volunteers basketball team represented the University of Tennessee in the 2013–14 NCAA Division I men's basketball season. The team's head coach was Cuonzo Martin, who was in his third season at Tennessee. The team played their home games at the Thompson–Boling Arena in Knoxville, Tennessee as a member of the Southeastern Conference.

Previous season
The Vols posted a record of 20–13 (11–7 SEC) in the 2012–13 season and finished sixth in the SEC standings in Cuonzo Martin's second season as head coach. The season was highlighted by a 30-point victory over rival Kentucky and a victory over a team that competed in the Final Four, Wichita State. The Volunteers lost in the first round of the 2013 NIT to Mercer.

Season Summary
Going into the season, Cuonzo Martin faced pressure and unrest from the Tennessee fanbase, restless after having missed the NCAA Tournament two consecutive seasons. During the 2011–12 and 2012-13 seasons, promising finishes to the regular season were undermined by early season losses to inferior out of conference opponents; bewildering losses to College of Charleston, Oakland and Austin Peay scuttled any hopes of a tournament appearance each of those seasons, respectively.  Frustrations grew shortly after Tennessee inexplicably dropped a game to a sub-100
RPI UTEP squad during the Battle for Atlantis tournament in November. A bubble team throughout the season, Tennessee ultimately nabbed a bid to the NCAA Tournament (despite the earlier loss to UTEP and suffering a sweep at the hands of a sub-100 RPI Texas A&M). In any case, Martin rallied the team to a 4-0 finish to end the regular season at 20-11. A victory over a moribund South Carolina outfit and a third straight loss to #1 Florida put Tennessee at 21-12. This was enough to earn Tennessee an at-large bid to the NCAA Tournament, Martin's first and only appearance with Tennessee. The Vols were placed in the First Four as an 11 seed, where Tennessee beat Iowa in overtime to move on to the field of 64. Tennessee routed Umass in the second round and Mercer in the round of 32. As a result, Tennessee earned a trip to the Sweet 16 for the first time since 2010. The Vols faced Michigan and came within one basket of making what would have been only their second Elite 8 appearance but fell to the Wolverines, 73-71, thanks to a controversial charge called on Jarnell Stokes.

Despite the late season surge and performance in the tourney (the latter accomplishment arguably the fruit of a favorable tournament draw and a Mercer upset of Duke), Cuonzo Martin would leave Tennessee at season's end to take the head coaching job at the University of California-Berkeley.

Roster

Schedule and results

|-
!colspan=12 style="background:#FF9933; color:white;"| Non-conference regular season

|-
!colspan=12 style="background:#FF9933; color:white;"| SEC regular season

|-
!colspan=12 style="background:#FF9933;"| SEC Tournament

|-
!colspan=12 style="background:#FF9933;"| NCAA tournament

See also
 2013–14 Tennessee Lady Volunteers basketball team

References

Tennessee
Tennessee Volunteers basketball seasons
Tennessee
Volunteers
Volunteers